New Strawn is a city in Coffey County, Kansas, United States.  As of the 2020 census, the population of the city was 414.

History
The city of New Strawn came about when John Redmond Reservoir was built in the early 1960s, causing the original town of Strawn to be claimed by the Army Corps of Engineers for flood area. The old city of Strawn is usually available for exploration, but will be underwater if the lake is up. Very little is left of "old" Strawn today, although the Main Street can still be traveled when dry. 
The school at the old site of Strawn was a two-room school with first through fourth grades in one room and fifth through eighth grade in the second room. The Strawn Methodist Church was just to the south. A small parking area is at the approximate site of the school and church.

Geography
New Strawn is located at  (38.2628, -95.7411).

Climate
The climate in this area is characterized by hot, humid summers and generally mild to cool winters.  According to the Köppen Climate Classification system, New Strawn has a humid subtropical climate, abbreviated "Cfa" on climate maps.

Demographics

2010 census
As of the census of 2010, there were 394 people, 163 households, and 126 families residing in the city. The racial makeup of the city was 95.9% White, 0.5% African American, 1.5% Native American, and 2.0% from two or more races. Hispanic or Latino of any race were 1.8% of the population.

There were 163 households, of which 30.1% had children under the age of 18 living with them, 63.2% were married couples living together, 9.2% had a female householder with no husband present, 4.9% had a male householder with no wife present, and 22.7% were non-families. 19.6% of all households were made up of individuals, and 3.1% had someone living alone who was 65 years of age or older. The average household size was 2.42 and the average family size was 2.72.

The median age in the city was 42 years. 22.1% of residents were under the age of 18; 3.8% were between the ages of 18 and 24; 28% were from 25 to 44; 36.8% were from 45 to 64; and 9.4% were 65 years of age or older. The gender makeup of the city was 49.7% male and 50.3% female.

2000 census
As of the census of 2000, there were 425 people, 150 households, and 120 families residing in the city. The racial makeup of the city was 95.53% White, 1.65% Native American, 0.94% Asian, 0.71% from other races, and 1.18% from two or more races. Hispanic or Latino of any race were 1.88% of the population.

There were 150 households, out of which 44.0% had children under the age of 18 living with them, 71.3% were married couples living together, 6.7% had a female householder with no husband present, and 20.0% were non-families. 17.3% of all households were made up of individuals, and 7.3% had someone living alone who was 65 years of age or older. The average household size was 2.83 and the average family size was 3.21.

In the city, the population was spread out, with 32.7% under the age of 18, 4.9% from 18 to 24, 27.8% from 25 to 44, 27.3% from 45 to 64, and 7.3% who were 65 years of age or older. The median age was 37 years. For every 100 females, there were 95.9 males. For every 100 females age 18 and over, there were 97.2 males.

The median income for a household in the city was $64,125, and the median income for a family was $70,250. Males had a median income of $48,750 versus $26,944 for females. The per capita income for the city was $22,288. None of the families and 2.4% of the population were living below the poverty line, including no under eighteens and 15.6% of those over 64.

Education
The community is served by Burlington USD 244 public school district.

References

Further reading

Further reading
An history of "Old Strawn", which was relocated to the site of New Strawn, was written by Mary Lou DeLong Atherly;  it is titled "Yesterday's Tomorrow: A History of Strawn, Kansas & Surrounding Territory", and is available through the Coffey County Museum in Burlington.

External links
 City of New Strawn
 New Strawn - Directory of Public Officials
 New Strawn city map, KDOT

Cities in Kansas
Cities in Coffey County, Kansas